Anson High School is a public, co-educational secondary school located in Wadesboro, North Carolina. It is one of four high schools in the Anson County Schools system.

School information
For the 2010–2011 school year, Anson High School had a total population of 822 students and 57.60 teachers on a (FTE) basis. The student population had a gender ratio of 48% male to 52% female. The demographic group makeup of the student population was: Black, 68.73%; White, 24.33%; Hispanic, 2.92%; Asian/Pacific Islander, 1.70%; and American Indian, 0.61% (two or more races, 1.70%). For the same school year, 75.12% of the students received free and reduced-cost lunches.

Administration
The current principal of Anson High School is Chris Stinson. Fred Davis is the assistant principal. Murphy was hired in 2009 to replace former principal George Boothby who retired in 2008.

Athletics
According to the North Carolina High School Athletic Association, for the 2011–2012 school year, Anson High School is a 3A school in the Southern Carolina Conference. The school's mascot is the Bearcats, wearing the school colors of orange and blue. They compete in various sports throughout the school year: cross country, men's and women's soccer, football, wrestling, volleyball, men's and women's basketball, baseball, golf, softball, and track and field. Since 2015-16 Anson High Bearcats have been designated 2A an compete in the Rocky River 2A conference.

Notable people
 Stephone Anthony, NFL linebacker
 Carla Cunningham, politician
 Cedrick Holt, American football cornerback
 Trinton Sturdivant, former collegiate offensive tackle at the University of Georgia
 Jerome Robinson, former collegiate Right/Center Outfielder at Clemson University
  Street Profits (Montez Ford) Tag Team Wrestler in WWE

References

External links
 

Buildings and structures in Anson County, North Carolina
Education in Anson County, North Carolina
Public high schools in North Carolina